Stuart Motor Company is a historic automobile showroom building located at Kernersville, Forsyth County, North Carolina.  It was built in 1926, and is a utilitarian brick building with a two-story front section and a tall one-story rear section.  The building previously featured "STUART MOTOR COMPANY" in Art Deco lettering.

It was listed on the National Register of Historic Places in 1988.

References

Commercial buildings on the National Register of Historic Places in North Carolina
Commercial buildings completed in 1926
Buildings and structures in Forsyth County, North Carolina
National Register of Historic Places in Forsyth County, North Carolina
1926 establishments in North Carolina